Mount Lunxhëri is a mountain in southern Albania in the geographical region of Southern Albanian Highlands. Its highest elevation is 2,156 m. Its orientation is northwest to southeast. The valley of the river Drino, with the city Gjirokastër, lies to its southwest. The Zagori region lies to its east. It is part of the mountain chain Shëndelli-Lunxhëri-Bureto chain, which goes parallel to the Trebeshinë-Dhembel-Nemërçkë chain. The mount has the same name of the region of Lunxhëri.

References

Mountains of Albania